Jean Vuaillat (1915–2009) was a French Roman Catholic priest, poet and biographer. He served as a priest in Lyon as well as small towns in the Loire and Rhône regions until he became a canon at the Lyon Cathedral in 1982. He published many poetry collections and several biographies. He won five literary prizes from the Académie française.

Early life
Jean Vuaillat was born in 1915 in Lyon.

Career
Vuaillat was ordained as a Roman Catholic priest in 1940. He served as a vicar in Givors near Lyon, and later at the Église Saint-Pierre de Vaise in Lyon. In the midst of World War II, in 1943, he served as a vicar to the Catholic youth in the Service du travail obligatoire in Germany. He subsequently published an account of his service in Poland entitled Ma vie en Pologne sous le IIIème Reich. At the end of the war, in 1945, he became the director of the Catholic school in Fourvière.

Vuaillat served as the vicar in Saint-Martin-en-Coailleux in the Loire region from 1950 to 1959. He was a vicar at the Basilica of St. Thérèse in Lisieux from 1959 to 1967, with a stint at Our Lady of Laus. He served as a vicar in Sainte-Catherine in the Rhône region from 1967 to 1982. Finally, he served as a canon at the Lyon Cathedral from 1982 to 1999.

Vuaillat was the founder and editor of Laudes, a journal, from 1967 to 2006.

Vuaillat published many poetry collections. He won five literary prizes from the Académie française: the Prix Véga et Lods de Wegmann for Solitude de neige in 1966; the Prix Archon-Despérouses for Douze psaumes in 1970; the Prix Marie Havez-Planque for Apprivoiser la mort in 1976; the Prix Capuran for Mariales et signets pour Noël in 1980; and the Prix François Coppée for Ciels d’arrière-saison in 1996.

Aside from poetry, Vuaillat authored the biographies of Saint Philip Neri as well as missionaries Jean-Pierre Néel and Benoît Berthet. He also published the biographies of composers Mozart and Gabriel Fauré.

Vuaillat was a significant book collector. He maintained a correspondence with Léopold Sédar Senghor, among many others.

Death and legacy
Vuaillat died in 2009. He bequeathed half his book collection to the Bibliothèque municipale de Lyon; the other half was auctioned.

Works

References

1915 births
2009 deaths
Clergy from Lyon
20th-century French Roman Catholic priests
French poets
French biographers
French Roman Catholic writers
French book and manuscript collectors
French World War II forced labourers